Tajikistan competed at the 2013 World Championships in Athletics in Moscow, Russia, from 10–18 August 2013.
A team of 2 athletes was announced to represent the country in the event.

Results

Men

Women

References

External links
IAAF World Championships – Tajikistan 

Nations at the 2013 World Championships in Athletics
World Championships in Athletics
Tajikistan at the World Championships in Athletics